The Arabian chameleon (Chamaeleo arabicus) is a species of chameleon native to the southern Arabian Peninsula. During the monsoon season, they turn green.

References

Chamaeleo
Reptiles of the Arabian Peninsula
Reptiles described in 1893
Taxa named by Paul Matschie